Gleat (stylized as GLEAT and pronounced as "great") is a Japanese professional wrestling and mixed martial arts promotion founded in 2020 by former Pro Wrestling Noah parent company Lidet Entertainment after the acquisition of Noah and DDT Pro-Wrestling by CyberAgent. The promotion is overseen by Hiroyuki Suzuki and former mixed martial artist and professional wrestler Kiyoshi Tamura. The promotion emphasizes the use of the UWFi combat sports-based wrestling style.

History 
In November 2018, Japanese advertising company Lidet Entertainment began investing in various business ventures in the professional wrestling industry including Riki Choshu's Power Hall show in December 2018. On January 29, 2019, Lidet Entertainment bought 75% shares of Pro Wrestling Noah, with the goal of transforming the promotion into the second largest promotion in Japan after New Japan Pro-Wrestling (NJPW). A year later due to Noah's financial struggles, Lidet Entertainment sold all shares of Pro Wrestling Noah to internet advertising company CyberAgent. Lidet's President Hiroyuki Suzuki wanting to continue to be involved with professional wrestling met with Kiyoshi Tamura several days after the sale of Noah. Suzuki later announced the formation of a new promotion, Gleat – it was additionally revealed that Kaz Hayashi and Nosawa Rongai would become the Gleat Chief Technical Officer and Chief Strategy Officer, respectively. Gleat promotes shows via its two sub-brands – G Prowrestling, a traditional puroresu brand, and Lidet UWF, a UWFi-inspired shoot style brand.

Gleat held its inaugural event, "Gleat Ver. 0", on October 15, 2020, which aired on Fighting TV Samurai on October 22, with the main event pitting Noah's Sugiura-gun (Takashi Sugiura, Kazuyuki Fujita and Kendo Kashin) against Jun Akiyama, Shuhei Taniguchi, and Daisuke Sekimoto. The participation of Noah wrestlers on Gleat events would cease after Nosawa Rongai resigned from his positions at Gleat to focus on his role as Noah booker. Following the end of the Noah partnership, Gleat would see the participation of wrestlers from other Japan-based wrestling promotions such as Sho from NJPW and Shinjiro Otani and Masato Tanaka from Pro Wrestling Zero1.

In February 2021, shoot style veterans Minoru Tanaka and Daijiro Matsui were signed by the company, shortly after Tanaka was given the UWF Rule Technical Officer executive role. In May, it was announced that Cima, El Lindaman, T-Hawk, and Issei Onitsuka would be leaving Oriental Wrestling Entertainment and Ryuichi Kawakami would be leaving Big Japan Pro Wrestling to join Gleat. Gleat also operates a developmental division, with Yu Iizuka, Soma Watanabe, and Takanori Ito being the promotion's inaugural trainees.

In December 2021, Gleat announced a 12-man tournament would be held from January 26 to February 22, 2022 to crown the inaugural G-Rex Champion. The tournament and championship were won by El Lindaman.

In July 2022, Gleat announced the creation of the G-Infinity Championship for its G Prowrestling brand. A four-team tournament was held from August 20, 2022, to August 24 to crown the inaugural champions. The tournament was won by Bulk Orchestra (Kazma Sakamoto and Ryuichi Kawakami). On December 14, Gleat promoted its first mixed martial arts (MMA) event, "Gleat MMA Ver. 0".

Personnel

Background
Gleat divides their roster based on its two sub-brands, G Prowrestling and Lidet UWF. Gleat also recognizes a third roster division, "M" – these wrestlers have legitimate mixed martial arts experience and may wrestle on either G Prowrestling or Lidet UWF events.
 G – Wrestlers affiliated to G Prowrestling, Gleat's sub-brand that promotes matches using regular professional wrestling rules.
 U – Wrestlers affiliated to Lidet UWF, Gleat's sub-brand that promotes matches using UWFi-inspired shoot style rules.
M – Wrestlers that have mixed martial arts experience; these wrestlers may be affiliated with either Gleat sub-brand.

Wrestlers

Contracted

Regular outsiders

Other personnel

Notable alumni/guests 

Abdullah Kobayashi 
Akane Fujita
Atsuki Aoyagi 
Bandido
Chihiro Hashimoto
Daijiro Matsui 
Daisuke Sekimoto
Drew Parker
Flamita
Gringo Loco
Jake Lee 
Jun Akiyama
Jun Masaoka 
Kazuyuki Fujita
Kendo Kashin
Koji Iwamoto
Komander
Kota Sekifuda
Masakatsu Funaki
Masato Kamino 
Masato Tanaka 
Mochi Miyagi
Nosawa Rongai
Seichi Ikemoto
Shigehiro Irie
Shinjiro Otani
Sho
Shuhei Taniguchi
Takashi Sugiura
Takuya Nomura
Tomoaki Honma 
Thekla

Championships

Gleat events

See also

Professional wrestling in Japan

References

External links
Lidet Entertainment official website

Entertainment companies established in 2020
Sports organizations established in 2020
2020 establishments in Japan
Japanese professional wrestling promotions
Mixed martial arts in Japan
Mixed martial arts organizations
Sports organizations of Japan